The Identitarian movement or Identitarianism is a pan-European, ethno-nationalist, far-right political ideology asserting the right of European ethnic groups and white peoples to Western culture and territories claimed to belong exclusively to them. Originating in France as Les Identitaires ("The Identitarians"), with its youth wing Generation Identity, the movement expanded to other European countries during the early 21st century. Building on ontological ideas of the German Conservative Revolution, its ideology was formulated from the 1960s onward by essayists such as Alain de Benoist, Dominique Venner, Guillaume Faye and Renaud Camus, who are considered the main ideological sources of the movement.

Identitarians promote concepts such as pan-European nationalism, localism, ethnopluralism, remigration, or the Great Replacement, and they are generally opposed to globalisation, multiculturalism, Islamization and extra-European immigration. Influenced by New Right metapolitics, they do not seek direct electoral results, but rather to provoke long-term social transformations and eventually achieve cultural hegemony and popular adhesion to their ideas. 

Some Identitarians explicitly espouse ideas of xenophobia and racialism, but most limit their public statements to more docile language. Strongly opposed to cultural mixing, they promote the preservation of homogeneous ethno-cultural entities, generally to the exclusion of extra-European migrants and descendants of immigrants. In 2019, the Identitarian Movement was classified by the German Federal Office for the Protection of the Constitution as right-wing extremist.

The movement is most notable in Europe, and although rooted in Western Europe, it has spread more rapidly to the eastern part of the continent through conscious efforts of the likes of Faye. It also has adherents among white nationalists in North America, Australia, and New Zealand. The United States–based Southern Poverty Law Center considers many of these organisations to be hate groups.

Origin and development 
The Identitarian ideology is generally believed to be derived from the Nouvelle Droite, a French far-right philosophical movement that was formed in the 1960s in order to adapt traditionalist, ethnopluralist and illiberal politics to a post-WWII European context and distance itself from earlier far-right ideologies like fascism and Nazism, mainly through a form of pan-European nationalism. The Nouvelle Droite opposes liberal democracy and capitalism, and is hostile to multiculturalism and the mixing of different cultures within a single society. Although it is not necessarily supremacist, it is racialist because it identifies Europeans as a race. Strategies and concepts promoted by Nouvelle Droite thinkers, such as ethnopluralism, localism, pan-European nationalism, and the use of meta-politics to influence public opinion, have shaped the ideological structure of the Identitarian movement.

Background 

The Nouvelle Droite has widely been considered a neo-fascist attempt to legitimise far-right ideas in the political spectrum, and in some cases to recycle Nazi ideas. According to political scientist Stéphane François, the latter accusation, "though relevant in certain ways, [remains] incomplete, as it (purposely) [shuns] other references, most notably the primordial relationship to the German Conservative Revolution." The original prominence of the French nucleus gradually decreased, and a nebula of similar movements which were grouped under the term "European New Right" began to emerge across the continent. Among them was the Neue Rechte of Armin Mohler, also largely inspired by the Conservative Revolution, and another ideological source for the Identitarian movement. Consequently, connections have been suggested between the worldview of Martin Sellner, one of the biggest figures of the movement, and the theories of Martin Heidegger and Carl Schmitt. Leading Identitarian Daniel Friberg has likewise claimed influences from Ernst Jünger and Julius Evola.

Through their think tank GRECE, Nouvelle Droite figures like Alain de Benoist and Guillaume Faye aimed to imitate Marxist meta-politics, especially the tactics of cultural hegemony, agitprop and entryism which, according to them, had allowed left-wing movements to gain cultural and academic dominance from the second part of the 20th century onward. Dominique Venner and his magazine Europe-Action, which is considered the "embryonic form" of the Nouvelle Droite, along with the writings of Saint-Loup, are conducive to the emergence of the Identitarian movement, by redefining the idea of European nationalism on the "white nation" rather than the "nation state".

Emergence 
The neo-Völkisch movement Terre et Peuple, which was founded in 1995 by Nouvelle Droite writers Pierre Vial, Jean Haudry and Jean Mabire, is generally considered a precursor of the Identitarian movement. In the early 21st century, Nouvelle Droite ideas influenced far-right youth movements in France through groups such as Jeunesses Identitaires (founded in 2002 and succeeded by Génération Identitaire in 2012) and Bloc Identitaire (2003). These French movements exported their ideas to other European nations, turning themselves into a pan-European movement of loosely connected Identitarian groups. In the 2000s and 2010s, thinkers led by Renaud Camus, Guillaume Faye, along with members of the Carrefour de l'Horloge, introduced the Great Replacement and remigration as defining concepts in the movement.

Scholar A. James McAdams has described the Identitarian movement as a "second generation" in the evolution of European far-right foundational critique of liberal democracy during the post-war era: "the first of these generations, congregated around the members of the French Nouvelle droite (New Right), defined difference as a right ('a right to difference') to which all persons were entitled by virtue of their shared humanity. A second generation, epitomized by the pan-European Identitarian movement of the early 2000s, replaced the language of rights with the less exacting claim to respect the differences of others, especially those based on ethnicity. Finally, in response to the degeneration of Identitarian thinking into outright xenophobia and racism, a third generation of theorists emerged in the 2010s with the expressed aim of restoring the respectability of far-right thought." According to scholar Imogen Richards, "while in many respects [Génération Identitaire] is characteristic of the 'European New Right' (ENR), its spokespersons' various promotion of capitalism and commodification, including through their advocacy of international trade and sale of merchandise, diverges from the anti-capitalist philosophizing of contemporary ENR thinkers."

Ideology

Definition 
Identitarianism can be defined by its opposition to globalisation, multiculturalism, Islam and extra-European immigration; and by its defence of traditions, pan-European nationalism and cultural homogeneity within the nations of Europe. The concept of "identity" is central to the Identitarian movement, which sees, in the words of Guillaume Faye, "every form of [humanity’s] homogenisation [as] synonymous with death, as well as sclerosis and entropy". Scholar Stéphane François has described the essence of Identitarian ideology as "mixophobic", that is the fear of ethnic mixing.

According to philosopher Pierre-André Taguieff, the Identitarian 'party-movements' generally share the following traits: a call to an 'authentic' and 'sane' people, which a leader is claiming to embody, against illegitimate or unworthy elites; and a call for a purifying break with the supposedly 'corrupt' current system, in part achieved by 'cleaning up' the territory from elements perceived as 'non-assimilable' for cultural reasons, Muslims in particular. Following Piero Ignazi, Taguieff classifies those party-movements as a new "post-industrial" far-right, distinct from the "traditional" nostalgic far-right. Their ultimate goal is to enter mainstream politics, Taguieff argues, as "post-fascists rather than neo-fascists, [and as] post-nazis rather than neo-nazis."

Scholars have also described the essence of Identitarianism as a reaction against the permissive ideals of the '68 movement, embodied by the baby-boomers and their perceived left-liberal dominance on society, which they sometimes label "Cultural Marxism".

Metapolitics 
Inspired by the metapolitics of Marxist philosopher Antonio Gramsci via the Nouvelle Droite, Identitarians do not seek direct electoral results but rather to influence the wider political debate in society. Metapolitics is defined by Nouvelle Droite theorist Guillaume Faye as the "social diffusion of ideas and cultural values for the sake of provoking profound, long-term, political transformation." In 2010, Daniel Friberg established the publishing house Arktos Media, which has grown since that date as the "uncontested global leader in the publication of English-language Nouvelle Droite literature." Some Identitarian parties have nonetheless contested elections, as in France or in Croatia, but so far with no success.

A key strategy of the Identitarian movement is to generate large media attention by symbolically occupying popular public spaces, often with only a handful of militants. The largest action to date, labelled "Defend Europe", occurred in 2017. After crowdsourcing more than $178,000, Identitarian militants chartered a ship in the Mediterranean Sea to ferry rescued migrants back to Africa, observe any incursions by other NGO ships into Libyan waters, and report them to the Libyan coastguard. In the event, the ship suffered an engine failure and had to be rescued by another ship from one of the NGOs rescuing migrants.

The European Identitarian movements often use a yellow lambda symbol, inspired by the shield designs of the Spartan army in the movie 300, based on the comic book by Frank Miller.

Ethnopluralism 
According to ethnographer Benjamin R. Teitelbaum, Identitarians advocate "an ostensibly non-hierarchical global separatism to create a 'pluriversum', where differences among peoples are preserved and celebrated." Political scientist Jean-Yves Camus agrees and defines the movement as being centred around the Nouvelle Droite concept of ethnopluralism (or 'ethno-differentialism'): "each people and culture can only flourish on its territory of origin; ethnic and cultural mixing (métissage) is seen as a factor of decadence; multiculturalism as a pathogenic project, producing crime, loss of bearings and, ultimately, the possibility of an 'ethnic war' on European lands, between 'ethnic Europeans' and non-native Maghrebi Arabs, in any case Muslims."

The pairing of Muslim immigration and Islam with the concept of ethnopluralism is indeed one of the main bases of Identitarianism, and the idea of a future ethnic war between whites and immigrants is central for some Identitarian theorists, especially Guillaume Faye, who claimed in 2016 that "the ethnic civil war, like a snake's baby that breaks the shell of its egg, [was] only in its very modest beginnings". He had earlier preached "total ethnic war" between "original" Europeans and Muslims in The Colonization of Europe in 2000, which earned him a criminal conviction for incitement to racial hatred. This emphasis on ethnicity, shared by Pierre Vial and his call to an "ethnic revolution" and a "war of liberation", is however opposed by other Identitarian thinkers and groups. Alain de Benoist disavowing Faye's "strongly racist" ideas regarding Muslims after the publication of his 2000 book. 

Identitarians generally dismiss the European Union as "corrupt" and "authoritarian", while at the same time defending a "European-level political body that can hold its own against superpowers like America and China." According to scholar Stéphane François, Identitarian geopolitics should be seen as a form of "ethnopolitics". In the Identitarian vision, the world would be structured into different "ethnospheres", each dominated by ethnically related peoples. They promote ethnic solidarities between European peoples, and the establishment of a confederation of regional identities that would eventually replace the various nation states of Europe, which are seen as an inheritance from the "dubious philosophy of the French Revolution". Influenced by Renaud Camus' Great Replacement theory, Identitarians lament an alleged disappearance of the European peoples through a drop in a birth rate and uncontrolled immigration from the Muslim world.

Views on Islam and liberalism 
The movement is strongly opposed to the politics and philosophy of Islam, which some critics describe as disguised Islamophobia. Followers often protest what they see as an Islamisation of Europe through mass immigration, claiming it is a threat to European culture and society. As summarised by Markus Willinger, a key activist of the movement, "We don't want Mehmed and Mustapha to become Europeans." This theory is connected to the ideas of the Great Replacement, a conspiracy theory which claims that a global elite is colluding against the white population of Europe to replace them with non-European peoples, and remigration, a project of reversing growing multiculturalism through a forced mass deportation of non-European immigrants (often including their descendants) back to their supposed place of racial origin, regardless of their citizenship status. Génération Identitaire has made frequent use of the term Reconquista, in reference to expulsion of Muslims and Jewish people from the Iberian Peninsula in 1492.

Identitarians do not share, however, a common vision on liberalism. Some regard it as a part of European identity "threatened by Muslims who do not respect women or gay people", whereas others like Daniel Friberg describe it as the "disease" that contributed to Muslim immigration in the first place.

Connection to other far-right groups
The movement has been described as being a part of the global alt-right, or as the European counterpart of the American alt-right. Hope Not Hate (HNH) has described Identitarianism and the alt-right as "ostensibly separate" in origin, but with "huge areas of ideological crossover". Many white nationalists and alt-right leaders have described themselves as Identitarians, and according to HNH, American alt-right influence is evident in European Identitarian groups and events, forming an amalgamated "International Alternative Right". Figures within the Identitarian movements and alt-right often cite Nouvelle Droite founder Alain de Benoist as an influence. De Benoist rejects any alt-right affiliation, although he has worked with Richard B. Spencer, and once spoke at Spencer's National Policy Institute. As Benoist stated, "Maybe people consider me their spiritual father, but I don't consider them my spiritual sons".

According to Christoph Gurk of Bayerischer Rundfunk, one of the goals of Identitarianism is to make racism modern and fashionable. Austrian Identitarians invited radical right-wing groups from across Europe, including several neo-Nazi groups, to participate in an anti-immigration march, according to Anna Thalhammer of Die Presse. There has also been Identitarian collaboration with the white nationalist activist Tomislav Sunić.

By location

France

The main Identitarian youth movement is Génération Identitaire in France, originally a youth wing of Bloc Identitaire before it split off in 2012 to become its own organisation. The association Terre et Peuple ("Land and People"), which represents the Völkisch leaning of the Nouvelle Droite, is seen as a precursor of the Identitarian movement. Political scientist Stéphane François estimated the size of the Identitarian movement in France to be 1,500–2,000 in 2017.

An undercover investigation conducted by Al Jazeera's Investigative Unit into the French branch, which aired on 10 December 2018, captured GI activists punching a Muslim woman whilst saying "Fuck Mecca" and one saying if ever he gets a terminal illness he will purchase a weapon and cause carnage. When asked by the undercover journalist who would be the target he replies "a mosque, whatever". French prosecutors have launched an inquiry into the findings amidst calls for the group to be proscribed.

Génération Identitaire was banned by French authorities in March 2021.

Austria

The Identitäre Bewegung Österreich (IBÖ) was founded in 2012. They have sometimes used the concept of a "War Against the '68ers"; i.e. people whose political identities are seen by Identitarians as stemming from the social changes of the 1960s, what would be called baby-boomer liberals in the US. 

On 27 April 2018 the IBÖ and the homes of its leaders were searched by the Austrian police, and investigations were started against Sellner on suspicion that a criminal organisation was being formed. The court later ruled that the IBÖ was not a criminal organisation.

Germany

The movement also appeared in Germany and converged with preexisting circles, centered on the magazine Blue Narcissus and its founder , a martial artist and former German Karate Team Champion, who according to Gudrun Hentges – who worked for the official Federal Agency for Civic Education – belongs to the "elite of the movement". It became a "registered association" in 2014. Drawing upon thinkers of the Nouvelle Droite and the Conservative Revolution such as Oswald Spengler, Carl Schmitt or the contemporary Russian fascist Aleksandr Dugin, it played a role in the rise of the PEGIDA marches in 2014–15.

The Identitarian movement has a close linkage to members of the German New Right, e.g., to its prominent member Götz Kubitschek and his journal Sezession, for which the Identitarian speaker Martin Sellner writes.

In August 2016 members of the Identitarian movement in Germany scaled the iconic Brandenburg Gate in Berlin and hung a banner in protest at European immigration and perceived Islamisation. In September of the same year, members of the Identitarian movement erected a new summit cross in a "provocative" act (as the Süddeutsche Zeitung reported) on the Schafreuter, after the original one had to be removed because of damage by an unknown person.

In June 2017, the PayPal donations account of the Identitarian "Defend Europe" was locked, and the Identitarian account of the bank "Steiermärkische Sparkasse" was closed.

On 11 July 2019, Germany's Federal Office for the Protection of the Constitution (BfV), the country's domestic intelligence agency, formally designated the Identitarian Movement as "a verified extreme right movement against the liberal democratic constitution." The new classification will allow the BfV to use more powerful surveillance methods against the group and its youth wing, Generation Identity. The Identitarian Movement has about 600 members in Germany.

United Kingdom
In July 2017, a Facebook page for Generation Identity UK and Ireland was created. A few months later, in October 2017, key figures of the Identitarian movement met in London in efforts to target the United Kingdom, and discussed the founding of a British chapter as a "bridge" to link with radical movements in the US. Their discussions resulted in a new British chapter being officially launched in late October 2017 with Tom Dupre and Ben Jones as its co-founders, after a banner was unfurled on Westminster Bridge reading "Defend London, Stop Islamisation".

On 9 March 2018, Sellner and his girlfriend Brittany Pettibone were barred from entering the UK because their presence was "not conducive to the public good".

Prior the ban, Sellner intended to deliver a speech to the Young Independence party, though they cancelled the event, citing supposed threats of violence from the far-left. Prior to being detained and deported, Sellner intended to deliver his speech at Speakers' Corner in Hyde Park. In June 2018 Tore Rasmussen, a Norwegian activist who had previously been denied entry to the United Kingdom, was working in Ireland to establish a local branch of Generation Identity.

In August 2018, the leader of GI UK Tom Dupre resigned from his position after UK press revealed Rasmussen, who was a senior member in the UK branch, had an active past in neo-Nazi movements within Norway.

Generation Identity UK has been conferencing with other organisations, namely Identity Evropa/American Identity Movement. Identity Evropa/American Identity Movement is known for its involvement in the deadly 11–12 August 2017 Unite the Right rally in Charlottesville, Virginia, United States and its antisemitism. Jacob Bewick, an activist with GI, had been exposed as a member of proscribed terror organisation National Action and was spotted at an NA march in 2016. At an after conference event, one GI UK member told a Hope not Hate informant that two members of the fascist National Front (and former NA members) were present.

The UK branch was condemned by the wider European movement on Twitter when it held its second annual conference and had invited numerous controversial alt-right speakers. Speaking alongside the UK's new leader Ben Jones was alt-right YouTuber Millennial Woes and Nouvelle Droite writer Tomislav Sunić. 

This controversy led to a number of members leaving the organisation in disgust at what they perceived to be a shift towards the "Old Right". This led to concern that the British version may become more radicalised and dangerous. Simon Murdoch, Identitarianism researcher at Hope not Hate, said: "Evidence suggests we will be left with a smaller but more toxic group in the UK, open to engagement with the more antisemitic, extreme and thus dangerous elements of the domestic far right".

According to Unite Against Fascism, the Identitarian Movement in the UK is estimated to have a membership of less than 200 activists as of June 2019.

Nordics 
In Sweden, the organisation  (active from 2004 to 2010), which founded the online encyclopedia Metapedia in 2006, promoted Identitarianism.

The influence of Identitarian theories has been noted in the Sweden Democrats' slogan "We are also a people!".

Other European groups
The origin of the Italian chapter Generazione Identitaria dates from 2012.

The founder of the far-right Croatian party Generation of Renovation has stated that it was originally formed in 2017 as that country's version of the alt-right and Identitarian movements.

The separatist party Som Catalans claims to defend the "identity of Catalonia" against "Spanish colonialism and the migrant invasion", as well as the "islamisation" of the Spanish autonomous community. Similar stances are also found in Spanish nationalist parties, such as Identitarios, which align themselves with the European Identity and Democracy Party. 

A Europol terror report mentioned Soldaten van Odin and the defunct group La Meute.

In the Netherlands,  was founded in 2012. Its main goal is "preservation of the national identity". Training their members at camps in France, their protests in the Netherlands attract tens of participants.

In Flanders, the website Voorpost is an ethnic nationalist (volksnationalist) group founded by Karel Dillen in 1976 as a splinter from the Volksunie. 
Voorpost pursues an irredentist ideal of a Greater Netherlands, a nation state that would unite all Dutch-speaking territories in Europe. 
The organisation has staged rallies on various topics, against Islam and mosques, against leftist organizations, against drugs, against pedophilia, and against socialism.

Non-European affiliates

Australasia 

There was a small group in Australia called Identity Australia around March 2019, which described itself as "a youth-focused identitiarian organisation dedicated to giving European Australians a voice and restoring Australia's European character", and published a manifesto detailing its beliefs, but its website is  non-operational.

The Dingoes are an Australian group who were described in a 2016 news report as "young, educated and alternative right", and were compared to the Identitarian movement in Europe. Members do not reveal their identity. National Party MP George Christensen and One Nation candidate Mike Latham were both interviewed on the Dingoes podcast, called The Convict Report, but Christensen later said that he would not have done it if he had known about their extremist views. The podcast also featured a New Zealand man who ran the Dominion Movement, who was later arrested for sharing information that threatened NZ security.

New Zealand had hosted the Dominion Movement, which labelled itself as "a grass-roots Identitarian activist organisation committed to the revitalisation of our country and our people: White New Zealanders". The website for the group shutdown alongside New Zealand National Front in the aftermath of the Christchurch mosque shootings in March 2019. In late 2019, the Dominion Movement was largely replaced by a similar white supremacist group called Action Zealandia, after its co-founder and leader, a New Zealand soldier, was arrested for sharing information that threatened NZ security.

Australian Brenton Harrison Tarrant, the perpetrator of the Christchurch mosque shootings in New Zealand, was a believer in the Great Replacement conspiracy theory, named his manifesto after it, and donated €1,500 to Austrian Identitarian leader Martin Sellner of Identitäre Bewegung Österreich (IBÖ) a year prior to the terror attacks. An investigation into the potential links between Tarrant and IBÖ was conducted by then Austrian Minister of the Interior Herbert Kickl. Other than the donation, no other evidence of contact or connections between the two parties has been found. The Austrian government is considering dissolving the group. The shooter also donated €2,200 to Génération Identitaire, the French branch of the Generation Identity. Tarrant exchanged emails with Sellner with one asking if they could meet for coffee or beer in Vienna and sent him a link to his YouTube channel. This was confirmed by Sellner, but he denied interacting with Tarrant in person or knowing of his plans. The Austrian government later opened an investigation into Sellner over suspected formation of a terrorist group with Tarrant and the former's fiancée Brittany Pettibone who met Australian far-right figure Blair Cottrell.

North America

United States

The now-defunct neo-Nazi Traditionalist Youth Network/Traditionalist Worker Party was modelled after the European Identitarian movement, according to the Southern Poverty Law Center and the Anti-Defamation League. Identity Evropa/American Identity Movement in the United States labels itself Identitarian, and is part of the alt-right. Richard Spencer's National Policy Institute is also a white nationalist movement, which advocates an American version of Identitarianism called "American Identitarianism". The SPLC also reports that the Southern California-based Rise Above Movement "is inspired by Identitarian movements in Europe and is trying to bring the philosophies and violent tactics to the United States".

On 20 May 2017, two non-commissioned officers with the U.S. Marines were arrested for trespassing after displaying a banner from a building in Graham, North Carolina, during a Confederate Memorial Day event. The banner included the Identitarian logo, and the phrase "he who controls the past controls the future", a reference to George Orwell's novel Nineteen Eighty-Four, along with the initialism YWNRU, or "you will not replace us". The Marine Corps denounced the behaviour and investigated the incident. A marine spokesperson commented to local news: "Of course we condemn this type of behavior ... we condemn any type of behavior that is not congruent with our values or that is illegal." Both men pleaded guilty to trespassing. One received military administrative punishment. The other was discharged from the corps.

Canada
The Canadian organisation Generation Identity Canada was formed in 2014, and was renamed IDCanada in 2017. The organisation has distributed material across the country, such as in Hamilton, Ontario, Saskatoon, Saskatchewan, Peterborough, Ontario, Prince Edward Island, Alberta, and in Quebec.

La Meute (French for "The Pack") is a Québécois nationalist pressure group and identitarian movement fighting against illegal immigration and radical Islam. The group was founded in September 2015 in Quebec by two former Canadian Armed Forces members, Éric Venne and Patrick Beaudry, both of whom have left the group. La Meute announced it would prefer "to become large enough and organized enough to constitute a force that can't be ignored". The group has been attacked by anti-fascists in Montreal. A parallel protest encampment was set up in Gatineau, Quebec, during the larger Freedom Convoy protests in Ottawa.  Steeve Charland of Grenville, Quebec, was arrested and charged in relation to the protests.  Charland was reported as one of the leaders of La Meute in opposition to Canada’s decision to open its borders to Syrian refugees.  During the “Freedom Convoy” protests in Ottawa, Steeve Charland acted as the leader and spokesperson for the Farfadaas, a group that opposes COVID-19 health measures and whose members are recognizable by their leather vests marked with an expletive hand gesture.

Critics 
Political scientist Cas Mudde has argued in 2021 that although Identitarians claim to share the slogan "0% racism, 100% identify" and officially subscribe to ethnopluralism, "the boundaries between biological and cultural arguments in the movement have become increasingly porous." An investigation led by political scientist Gudrun Hentges came to the conclusion that the Identitarian movement is ideologically situated between the French National Front, the Nouvelle Droite, and neo-Nazism.

See also
 Identity politics
 White nationalism
 Nativism
 Great Replacement
 Remigration
 Ghost skin

References

Notes

Bibliography

Further reading

External links
 
 

 
21st-century social movements
Activism by issue
Anti-immigration politics in Europe
Anti-Islam sentiment
Pan-European nationalism
Identity politics in Europe
Anti-Islam sentiment in Europe
Social movements in Europe
White nationalism
White separatism
Far-right politics in Europe
New Right (Europe)